Die Arbeider en arm boer (meaning The Workers and Poor farmers in English) was an Afrikaans-language monthly publication issued by the Communist Party of South Africa. Five issues were published between January–June 1935. The magazine was headquartered in Johannesburg. It is described as having an aim to attract poor, Africaans-speaking whites to join the communist party.

References

1935 in South Africa
Afrikaans-language magazines
Afrikaner culture in Johannesburg
Communist magazines
Communism in South Africa
Defunct magazines published in South Africa
Defunct political magazines
Magazines established in 1935
Magazines disestablished in 1935
Monthly magazines published in South Africa
Mass media in Johannesburg